The austral canastero (Asthenes anthoides) is a species of bird in the family Furnariidae, the ovenbirds. It is found in southern Argentina and Chile, including Tierra del Fuego. It is at least partially migratory, and its range extends north during the austral winter.

Its natural habitats are temperate shrublands and grasslands in non-arid portions of Patagonia.

It forages on the ground for insects and perches on shrubs for singing or when disturbed.

References

External links
Austral canastero photo gallery VIREO
Photo-High Res & Article; Photo-Medium Res avesdechile

Austral canastero
Birds of Patagonia
Birds of Tierra del Fuego
Austral canastero
Taxa named by Phillip Parker King
Taxonomy articles created by Polbot